Ochropleura leucogaster, or Radford's flame shoulder, is a moth of the family Noctuidae. The species was first described by Christian Friedrich Freyer in 1831. It is found near the Mediterranean Sea, southern Europe, Turkey, Lebanon, Israel, North Africa and southern Africa as well as on some islands of the Indian Ocean. It is believed to be extinct in Great Britain unlike O. plecta.

The wingspan is 32–36 mm. Adults are on wing from April to May depending on the location. There are two generations per year.

The larvae feed on various herbaceous plants, Scrophulariaceae, Balsaminaceae and Ericaceae

References

External links

Radford's Flame Shoulder at UKMoths

Lepiforum e. V. 

Ochropleura
Moths described in 1831
Owlet moths of Africa
Owlet moths of Europe
Moths of Madagascar
Moths of the Middle East
Moths of Réunion
Moths of Asia
Lepidoptera of Zambia
Insects of Zimbabwe
Taxa named by Christian Friedrich Freyer